Laimonis Laizāns (born 30 January, 1945, died 16 November, 2020) was a former Soviet Latvian football goalkeeper who played for FK Daugava Rīga and Torpedo Moscow. He is considered one of the best Latvian goalkeepers of all time.

Playing biography

Laizāns was still a school student when he was approached by famous Latvian football manager Vadims Ulbergs and offered him to start training in football. At first Laizāns played on field but he didn't have especial talents. That would change when for one game the team he played for had no goalkeeper and Laizāns was put in goal and since then he only played in goal, although he himself didn't like it at first because he wanted to score goals himself.

As at that time most sportsmen in Latvia played both football and ice hockey until 1965 Laizāns played both and only then decided to devote his career entirely to football.

After a couple of seasons with FK Daugava Rīga he got offers from several Soviet Top League clubs. He chose to join Torpedo Moscow, the team of Valentin Ivanov and Eduard Streltsov. In the first season for Torpedo Laizāns played in 25 matches (succeeding 16 goals). But in winter while playing ice hockey Laizāns had an injury which crossed out his chances to remain in the top league, so Laizāns returned to Daugava. With Daugava he played until 1976. Afterwards he played a couple of years with FK Alfa in the Latvian championship.

References

1945 births
Living people
Latvian footballers
Daugava Rīga players
FC Torpedo Moscow players
Association football goalkeepers